Oshawa, Minnesota may refer to:
Oshawa, Cass County, Minnesota
Oshawa, Nicollet County, Minnesota